National Union of Students and Pupils of Mali (in French: Union Nationale des Etudiants et des Elèves du Mali) was a student movement in Mali.

UNEEM was founded in January 1979. It was banned by the government.

In early 1980 massive protests erupted over the non-payment of student bourses. In February that year, fire-brand leader Abdul Karim "Cabral" Camara was elected general secretary of UNEEM.

On March 8 UNEEM led a protest march in Bamako outside a summit of states of the Sahara region. Violence broke out, and police killed 13 students. Camara was jailed, and killed in detention. UNEEM was suppressed and ceased to function.

References

History of Mali
Student political organizations
Youth organisations based in Mali
Organizations disestablished in 1980
1979 establishments in Mali
Student organizations established in 1979